It Came From Something Awful: How a Toxic Troll Army Accidentally Memed Donald Trump into Office is a 2019 book by Dale Beran, focusing on the intersection of Internet culture, alt-right, and Donald Trump's presidency.

References 

2019 non-fiction books
Books about politics of the United States
Books about the Internet
Books about Donald Trump
St. Martin's Press books